Benjamin James McKenna (born 16 January 1993) is an English-born  Northern Irish footballer who plays for Clitheroe. He plays as a midfielder.

Early life
McKenna was born in Burnley, Lancashire. He attended Blessed Trinity RC College in the town. He started off at Burnley's academy, but after being released by his hometown club, McKenna joined Carlisle United on a two-year YTS contract.

Career

Club

Carlisle United and loans
After impressive performances in the youth and reserve teams, McKenna got called up to the first team squad and made his senior debut for Carlisle United in a 6–0 FA Cup first round victory against Tipton Town in November 2010, as a 46th-minute substitute McKenna made his League debut in February 2011, during a 1–0 defeat to Sheffield Wednesday as a 79th-minute substitute. On 12 January 2012, he joined Scottish Third Division side Annan Athletic on loan until the end of the 2011–12 season. On 3 May 2012, Carlisle United announced that McKenna's contract would not be renewed at the end of the 2011–12 season.

Workington
After having an unsuccessful trial with League Two side Accrington Stanley in January 2013 McKenna joined Workington Reds on 4 March 2013  for the remainder of the 2012–2013 season.

Stalybridge Celtic
Between June 2014 and May 2016 he played for Stalybridge Celtic.

Bradford Park Avenue
In the summer of 2016 he joined Bradford Park Avenue.

Southport
In November 2016 he joined Southport.

Stockport County
He then joined Stockport County.

Curzon Ashton
McKenna left Stockport County in February 2018 to join fellow National League North side, Curzon Ashton.

Bradford Park Avenue (second spell)
In June 2018 he returned to Bradford Park Avenue for a second spell with the club.

Chester
In January 2019 he joined Chester from league rivals Bradford Park Avenue.

International
McKenna has been capped for Northern Ireland at under-17 under-18 and under-19 level.

Career statistics

References

External links

1993 births
Living people
Footballers from Burnley
English people of Irish descent
English people of Northern Ireland descent
English footballers
Association footballers from Northern Ireland
Association football midfielders
Carlisle United F.C. players
Annan Athletic F.C. players
Workington A.F.C. players
Stalybridge Celtic F.C. players
Ashton United F.C. players
English Football League players
Scottish Football League players
National League (English football) players
Northern Premier League players
Northern Ireland youth international footballers
Stockport County F.C. players
Southport F.C. players
Bradford (Park Avenue) A.F.C. players
Chester F.C. players
Curzon Ashton F.C. players
Spennymoor Town F.C. players
Clitheroe F.C. players